The Church of Santa María de los Reyes (Spanish: Iglesia de Santa María de los Reyes) is a church located in Laguardia, Spain. It was declared Bien de Interés Cultural in 1931.

References 

Churches in Álava
Bien de Interés Cultural landmarks in Álava